Take Out with Lisa Ling is a documentary television series about Asian American cuisine.

See also
 List of HBO Max original programming

References

HBO Max original programming
Asian-American cuisine
American documentary television series